Cornufer mimicus is a species of frog in the family Ceratobatrachidae.
It is endemic to Papua New Guinea.
 
Its natural habitats are subtropical or tropical moist lowland forests and plantations .

References

Sources

mimicus
Amphibians of Papua New Guinea
Taxonomy articles created by Polbot
Amphibians described in 1968